Ronald Gray (born 1965) is an American convicted serial murderer and rapist.

Ronald Gray may also refer to:
 Ronald Gray (athlete) (1932–2019), Australian athlete
 Ronald Gray (painter) (1868–1951), British painter
 Ronald E. Gray, American politician in Delaware

See also
Ron Gray (disambiguation)